Huta-Mezhyhirska is a village in Vyshhorod Raion (district) in Kyiv Oblast of Ukraine. It belongs to Petrivtsi rural hromada, one of the hromadas of Ukraine. 

On 13 March 2022, during the Russian invasion of Ukraine, photojournalist Maks Levin was killed near the village and his body was found on 1 April.

References

Villages in Vyshhorod Raion